The following lists events that happened during the year 2005 in Bosnia and Herzegovina.

Incumbents
Presidency:
Sulejman Tihić 
Dragan Čović (until May 9), Ivo Miro Jović (starting May 9)
Borislav Paravac
Prime Minister: Adnan Terzić

 
Years of the 21st century in Bosnia and Herzegovina
2000s in Bosnia and Herzegovina
Bosnia and Herzegovina
Bosnia and Herzegovina